The 1984 Virginia Slims of Indianapolis, also known as the Ginny of Indianapolis, was a women's tennis tournament played on indoor carpet courts at the Indianapolis Racquet Club in Indianapolis in the United States that was part of the Ginny Tournament Circuit of the 1984 Virginia Slims World Championship Series. The tournament was held from January 30 through February 5, 1984. JoAnne Russell won the singles title.

Finals

Singles
 JoAnne Russell defeated  Pascale Paradis 7–6, 6–2
 It was Russell's 1st singles title of the year and of her career.

Doubles
 Cláudia Monteiro /  Yvonne Vermaak defeated  Beverly Mould /  Elizabeth Smylie 6–4, 6–7, 7–5
 It was Monteiro's 1st title of the year and the 4th of her career. It was Vermaak's 1st title of the year and the 5th of her career.

Notes

References

External links
 ITF tournament edition details
 Tournament poster
 Tournament pamphlet

Virginia Slims of Indianapolis
Virginia Slims of Indianapolis
Virginia Slims of Indianapolis
Virginia Slims of Indianapolis
Virginia Slims of Indianapolis
Virginia Slims of Indianapolis